La Costa Canyon High School (LCC) is a public high school located in Carlsbad, California. It is an International Baccalaureate World School and is part of the San Dieguito Union High School District, serving the communities of Encinitas, south Carlsbad, Leucadia, Olivenhain, and Cardiff.

La Costa Canyon enrolls an estimated 1,800 students in grades 9–12. The school receives accreditation approval from the Western Association of Schools and Colleges (WASC). Concurrent enrollment programs are provided in large by MiraCosta College.

Justin Conn has been principal of La Costa Canyon High School since July 2022.

General information
La Costa Canyon High School enrolled 1,834 students during the 2020-2021 school year. The school follow a semester schedule where students can enroll in up to seven courses per school year. LCC the only International Baccalaureate World School in the district, offering the IB Diploma Programme since 2019. The pupil-teacher ratio is approximately 24:1. Approximately 95% of the students are college bound. The district does not rank students or name valedictorian or salutorian. An estimated 25 percent of the student body receives the State Seal of Biliteracy.

The student body is 75.1% Caucasian, 16% Hispanic, 3.4% Asian, 1% Filipino, 0.9% African-American, 0.3% Pacific Islander, 0.2% American Indian or Alaska Native, 3.1% Two or More Races.

Faculty
Justin Conn has been principal since July 2022, preceded by Reno Medina. Katie Bendix, Leo Fletes, and Brenda Robinette serve as assistant principals. 

The faculty consists of a principal, three assistant principals, four counselors, a media-specialist, and over 125 certificated staff members. Approximately 88% have degrees beyond a bachelor's degree.

Athletics
La Costa Canyon is a member of the California Interscholastic Federation, the governing body for high school sports in the state of California. LCC has many teams ranked highly on both a national and statewide level and has produced numerous CIF division champions and professional sports players. Over 85% of the student body competes in school sports teams and clubs.

La Costa Canyon offers the following sports:

Notable alumni
Eric Avila, soccer player in the Major League Soccer
Chase Budinger, former NBA player for the, Houston Rockets, Indiana Pacers, Minnesota Timberwolves
 Dasha Burns, journalist
 Andrew Briedis, writer
 Phillip Evans, baseball player for New York Mets, Chicago Cubs, Pittsburgh Pirates
 Cubbie Fink, former bassist for Foster the People
 Ryan Guy, soccer player 
 Karsta Lowe, Olympic volleyball player on 2016 United States women's national volleyball team
 Erik Magnuson, NFL football player for the San Francisco 49ers
 Mickey Moniak, baseball player selected 1st overall, Philadelphia Phillies in 2016 MLB Draft
Kevin O'Connell, former NFL player, current Head Coach of the Minnesota Vikings
 Vinny Perretta, former NFL player for the Minnesota Vikings
 David Quessenberry, NFL football player for the Houston Texans, Tennessee Titans, Buffalo Bills
 Scott Quessenberry, NFL football player for the Los Angeles Chargers
 Sebastian Soto, American soccer player for Austria Klagenfurt
 Kendyl Stewart, swimmer for the U.S. national team
 Kenny Stills, NFL football player for the Miami Dolphins, New Orleans Saints, Houston Texans, Buffalo Bills
 Joe Toledo, former NFL football player for the Miami Dolphins, San Diego Chargers, Green Bay Packers, San Francisco 49ers, Seattle Seahawks, Philadelphia Eagles

References

External links
 Official website
 Official San Dieguito Union High School District Website

Educational institutions established in 1996
1996 establishments in California
San Dieguito Union High School District
High schools in San Diego County, California
Public high schools in California
Carlsbad, California